Candalides lamia is a species of butterfly of the family Lycaenidae. It was described by Henley Grose-Smith in 1897. It is found in Papua New Guinea on Fergusson Island and Goodenough Island.

References

Candalidini
Butterflies described in 1897
Taxa named by Henley Grose-Smith